The Geological Survey of Finland ( abbreviated GTK) is the geological survey of Finland. The organization was founded in 1885 when Emperor Alexander III decreed that the Geological Survey of Finland (Suomen geologinen tutkimus) be established. The survey produces impartial and objective research data and services in support of decision-making in industry, academia, and wider society. provides solutions to accelerate the transition to sustainable and carbon-neutral world. GTK employs more than 400 experts specialising in the mineral economy, circular economy, solutions related to energy, water and the environment, as well as digital solutions. GTK is a research institution governed by the Finnish Ministry of Employment and the Economy, operating in Finland and globally.

Publications

The Geological Survey of Finland publishes the Geological Survey of Finland, Bulletin since 1895. Before 1971 this publication was named Bulletin de la Commission géologique de Finlande. From 1929 to 1968 the Bulletin de la Commission géologique de Finlande appeared in a double edition together with the publication Comptes Rendus de la Société Géologique de Finlande of The Geological Society of Finland. The survey publishes also "special papers" and "reports of investigation".

Directors
 Kimmo Tiilikainen 2021-
Mika Nykänen, 2014-2021
 Elias Ekdahl, 2004-2014
 Raimo Matikainen 1997-2003
 Veikko Lappalainen 1992-1997
 Kalevi Kauranne 1980-1991
 Herman Stigzelius 1970–1980
 Vladi Marmo 1960–1969
 Aarne Laitakari 1935–1960
 Jakob Johannes Sederholm, 1893-1933
 K. A. Moberg 1886-1893

Regional offices
The agency is divided into 4 regional offices based in the cities listed below:
 Eastern; Kuopio 
 Northern; Rovaniemi
 Southern; Espoo
 Western; Kokkola

References

External links
Official website

Geological surveys
Research institutes in Finland